Sardulgarh tehsil is one of the three tehsils (or taluk) of Mansa district of Punjab, India. The other two are Budhlada and Mansa. It borders with the state of Haryana in the south and the Barnala-Sirsa highway goes through the tehsil main city of Sardulgarh. The river, Ghaggar also flows through the tehsil. It has 78 villages falling under it with a development block of Jhunir.

See also 
Budhlada

References 

Mansa district, India
Tehsils of India